LJ Institute of Business Administration (LJIBA) is an undergraduate business school affiliated with Gujarat University and based in Ahmedabad, Gujarat, India. It was founded in 1998. It gives a three-year BBA (Bachelor of Business Administration) degree to the graduates. It provides two specialisations in the third year of attendance: Accountancy and Marketing.

The college is owned and managed by the Lok Jagruti Kendra trust.

Course 
The course is a three-year programme leading to a BBA degree, awarded by Gujarat University. BBA is an intermediate degree leading to professional and other academic courses.

Affiliation 
The college is affiliated to Gujarat University. It acts as an undergraduate center of Gujarat University and follow the schedules of the university department for academic and operational purposes.

References 

 LJ Institute of Business Administration, webpage

Universities and colleges in Ahmedabad
Business schools in Gujarat
Gujarat University